There were four special elections in 1977 to the United States House of Representatives in the 95th United States Congress.  Three of the elections were gains by the Republicans at the expense of Democrats.

List of elections 

Elections are listed by date and district.

|-
! 
| Robert Bergland
|  | Democratic
| 
|  | Incumbent resigned January 22, 1977, to become U.S. Secretary of Agriculture.New member elected February 22, 1977.Republican gain.
| nowrap | 

|-
! 
| Andrew Young
|  | Democratic
| 
|  | Incumbent resigned January 29, 1977, to become United States Ambassador to the United Nations .New member elected  April 6, 1977.Democratic hold.
| nowrap | 

|-
! 
| Brock Adams
|  | Democratic
| 
|  | Incumbent resigned January 22, 1977, to become U.S. Secretary of Transportation .New member elected  May 17, 1977.Republican gain.
| nowrap | 

|-
! 
| Richard A. Tonry
|  | Democratic
| 
|  | Incumbent resigned May 4, 1977.New member elected August 27, 1977.Republican gain.
| nowrap | 

|}

References 

 
1977